Inspirations is an album by the English heavy metal band Saxon, released on 19 March 2021 by Silver Lining Music. Consisting entirely of covers, it was recorded at Brockfield Hall and The Big Silver Barn in York, UK and produced by Biff Byford.

Background
Inspirations consists of covers of songs of various artists from the 1960s and 1970s that influenced Saxon over the years. Byford said ″We wanted to do an album based on our influences, the songs and bands that inspired us to write what we did and still do, and it was also interesting to see what my voice could do as I haven’t sung many of these songs before.″ The songs are mostly from the hard rock, Psychedelic rock, Blues rock, and heavy metal genres. The band played close to the musical styles of the bands they covered, but also added some of their own heavier sound.

To record the album the band travelled to historic Brockfield Hall in York, where they played and recorded the songs live. Byford recorded his vocals at The Big Silver Barn, also in York.

Three music videos were released from this album. The first video was released on 11 December 2020 for the song ″Paint It Black″. The video features a behind-the-scenes look Saxon performing the song at Brockfield Hall, where the album was recorded. The second video was released on 15 January 2021 for the song ″Speed King″. The video features clips of rally cars speeding down various tracks. The third video is a lyric video for the song ″Paperback Writer″. The video consists of a digital animation of a quill writing out the lyrics of the songs on paper as they are sung, cut with shots of the album art during instrumental portions.

Reception

The album is generally well received. It managed to chart in several countries, reaching a peak of 10 on the German music charts. It was described as ″vibrant and brashly entertaining″ by Dom Lawson in his review for Blabbermouth. He also described being able to hear Biff Byford sing several of the tracks as "an absolute joy".

Track listing

Personnel
Saxon 
 Biff Byford – Vocals
 Paul Quinn – Guitars
 Doug Scarratt – Guitars
 Nibbs Carter – Bass
 Nigel Glockler – Drums

Charts

References

External links
 
 
 

Saxon (band) albums
2021 albums
Covers albums